Dirk Adorf (born 10 July 1969 in Altenkirchen, Rhineland-Palatinate) is a German racing driver. 

Starting with small cars, he won the Nürburgring VLN German Endurance Trophy in 1992, 1996 and 1997. This earned him drives in the German Super Tourenwagen Cup (STW) during 1995. 

He would return to the STW in 1999, this time with Opel. After three seasons in the 2000cc touring car series, he moved to V8Star Series in 2002. His last competition there was in 2003, when he drove two races in V8Star. After the series folded, his team took the big Jaguar-bodied V8Star to the Nürburgring VLN endurance series, and after successfully adopting the car, they won a race in 2003, together with Hermann Tilke.

For 2004, her moved to the team Raeder, winning some more races. Later, he decided to enter a Lamborghini Gallardo, but with little success as the car remained unreliable, such as at the 2009 24 Hours Nürburgring. The team then acquired a FIA GT3-spec Ford GT from Matech, with which Adorf surprisingly set pole for the 24h race, against strong competition.

24 Hours of Zolder

References

1969 births
Living people
People from Altenkirchen
Racing drivers from Rhineland-Palatinate

Nürburgring 24 Hours drivers
24H Series drivers